Ploskoye is a rural locality (a village) in Nikolskoye Rural Settlement, Kaduysky District, Vologda Oblast, Russia. The population was 13 as of 2002.

Geography 
Ploskoye is located 53 km northwest of Kaduy (the district's administrative centre) by road. Krasnoye is the nearest rural locality.

References 

Rural localities in Kaduysky District